is a single by the Jpop group Osaka Performance Doll and was used as the second closing theme for the Japanese-language dub of the 1987 Ninja Turtles series. It was written by Takemi Shima and composed by Tsugutoshi Goto. It was released by Epic Records on November 2, 1994 in Japan only and is coupled with the song "So Blue so Funny".

Track list
Lady Boy
So BLUE So Funny
Lady Boy(オリジナル・カラオケ)Lady Boy (Orijinaru Karaoke)/Lady Boy (Original Karaoke)

1994 singles
Teenage Mutant Ninja Turtles music
1994 songs